Moto Racer World Tour is an arcade style motorcycle racing game developed by Delphine Software International and published by SCEE in Europe and Infogrames in North America for the PlayStation.

In Moto Racer World Tour, the player drives a motorcycle in races against opponents. A large portion of the game centers on the World Tour Championship game mode, which tasks the player with completing a series races against the AI.

Gameplay

The game places the player in motocross races against opponents on various terrain. The game plays as an arcade racer, where it does not attempt to perfectly simulate actual motocross. The main portion of the game is featured around the World Tour Championship mode, which places the player in races of varying degrees of difficulty, and requires the player to beat their opponents in sequence. An arcade mode allows players to choose any event for single races. Once the player has completed some championships, the game opens up new modes for the player, including traffic (where the player races through incoming traffic), dragster (drag racing), and freestyle (freestyle motocross).

Moto Racer World Tour contains race tracks on normal pavement, grass, and dirt, lending to a variety of different handling techniques. An easy turn on pavement can cause a bike to spin out on dirt if the player is not careful about how hard they turn. In order to adjust to the different terrain, handling can be adjusted through a detailed pit stop, where the player can choose the looseness of their suspension and their tires among other things. The game, however, lacks Moto Racer 2s track editor.

Reception

The game received average reviews according to the review aggregation website GameRankings. IGNs Douglass C. Perry wrote that Moto Racer World Tour ranked "... up there in the top five motorcycle games on the system". He praised the game's fun, arcade style play, but noted that the game "was quite void" of many sounds. GamePro criticized the game's controls for being tough to handle, although they praised the game's good background music. However, NextGens Doug Trueman wrote in his scathing review: "Moto Racer World Tour is clearly an effort to siphon off some of the success of Excitebike 64. What makes it stand apart from most bike racers is that it enables you to race in both outdoor and indoor motocross events, as well as superbike competitions. But, like most of the bikes it features, this title is mired in muck."

References

External links
 

2000 video games
Delphine Software International games
Infogrames games
Multiplayer and single-player video games
PlayStation (console) games
PlayStation (console)-only games
Racing video games
Sony Interactive Entertainment games
Video games developed in France